Toward Point Lighthouse is on the southern extremity of the Cowal Peninsula, near the village of Toward, Argyll and Bute, Scotland. There has been a lighthouse here since 1812.

Toward Point Lighthouse was completed in 1812. It was built by Robert Stevenson (1772–1850) for the Cumbrae Lighthouse Trust.   Two lighthouse keepers' houses were added in the later 1800s. A white building on the foreshore housed the foghorn mechanism,  originally a steam engine and then diesel engines. The foghorn was taken out of operation in the 1990s. The keeper's cottages were sold in 2012 and are now a private home.

Toward Point marks the extreme south-westerly point of the Highland Boundary Fault as it crosses the Scottish mainland.
The Highland Boundary Fault does not run through Toward Point, but about one kilometre to the west it can be located on the Toward shore by the presence of Serpentinite and the sudden change from younger sedimentary rocks to much older metamorphic rocks, notably Psammite.

Gallery

See also
List of lighthouses in Scotland
List of places in Argyll and Bute
Castle Toward

Footnotes

External links 

Canmore web-page
A picture of Toward Point Lighthouse from the bbc.co.uk/scotland/whereilive website.
Combined Operations, Royal Navy

Category B listed lighthouses
Lighthouses in Scotland
Category B listed buildings in Argyll and Bute
Cowal
Highland Boundary Fault
Firth of Clyde
Lighthouses completed in 1812
Works of Robert Stevenson (civil engineer)